El Marg Stadium is a multi-purpose stadium. It is currently used mostly for football matches but there are several courts for basketball, volleyball and futsal.

El Marg SC formerly played their home games at El Marg Stadium.

There are also courts for karate, kungfu, taekwondo, weightlifting, table tennis.

 Capacity : 2,000
 Address : Al-Markaz Al-Egtema'y Street, El-Marg.
 Site : Cairo, Egypt.

References

1976 establishments in Egypt
Football venues in Egypt
Stadiums in Cairo
Sports venues completed in 1976
Football in Cairo